Boston Properties, Inc. is a publicly traded real estate investment trust that invests in premier workplaces in Boston, Los Angeles, New York City, San Francisco, Seattle, and Washington, D.C. As of June 30, 2022, the company owned or had interests in 193 commercial real estate properties, aggregating approximately 53.7 million square feet.

History
The company was founded in 1970 by Mortimer B. Zuckerman and Edward H. Linde in Boston.

In 1985, the company outbid Donald Trump to re-develop the New York Coliseum at Columbus Circle. However the company did not proceed with development and sold the property, it is now the site of the Time Warner Center. In 1986, the company completed 599 Lexington Avenue, its first development in New York City.

In 1990, the company began construction of the NASA Headquarters. It was sold to Hana Financial Group in 2002.

In June 1997, the company became a public company via an initial public offering. In October 1997, the company acquired 100 East Pratt Street.

In 1998, it acquired Embarcadero Center for about $1.22 billion and acquired Prudential Tower and The Shops at Prudential Center for $519 million.

In 2000 and 2001, the company completed development of several office buildings in Reston Town Center. From 2002 to 2005, it constructed 901 New York Avenue NW in Washington, D.C.

In June 2008, the company acquired the General Motors Building in New York City for $2.8 billion, the highest paid for an American office building.

In October 2010, the company acquired 200 Clarendon Street (formerly John Hancock Tower) for $930 million.

In 2012, the company partnered with Hines Interests Limited Partnership to develop Salesforce Tower. By 2019, it had acquired 100% of the property.

References

External links
 

Companies listed on the New York Stock Exchange
Real estate companies established in 1970
Real estate investment trusts of the United States
Companies based in Boston
Property management companies
1970 establishments in Massachusetts
1997 initial public offerings
Sovereign wealth fund portfolio companies